Angelino Soler Romaguera (born Alcazar, 25 November 1939) is a former professional road bicycle racer from Spain who won the 1961 Vuelta a España. The following year, Soler captured three mountainous stages to win the climbers classification at the 1962 Giro d'Italia.

Major achievements 

1959
 Volta a Lleida
1961 – 
 1st, Overall, Vuelta a España
 1st, Stage 6, (Tortosa > Valencia, 188 km
 1st, Stage 1a, Team Time Trial
1962 – Ghigi
 12th, Overall, Giro d'Italia
 1st, KoM Classification
 1st, Stage 3, (Sestri Levante > Panicogliara, 225 km
 1st, Stage 16, (Aprica > Pian dei Resinelli, 123 km
 1st, Stage 18, (Casale Monferrato > Frabrosa Soprana, 232 km
1963
 2nd, Overall, Volta a Catalunya
 6th, Overall, Tour de France
1965
 22nd, Overall, Tour de France
1966
 1st, Overall, Volta a la Comunitat Valenciana

External links 

Official Tour de France results for Angelino Soler

1939 births
Living people
Spanish male cyclists
Vuelta a España winners
Spanish Vuelta a España stage winners
Spanish Giro d'Italia stage winners
People from Horta Sud
Sportspeople from the Province of Valencia
Cyclists from the Valencian Community